Stictothrips is a genus of thrips in the family Phlaeothripidae.

Species
 Stictothrips aoristus
 Stictothrips faurei
 Stictothrips leopardinus
 Stictothrips maculatus
 Stictothrips namadji

References

Phlaeothripidae
Thrips
Thrips genera